Bumaga Island is an island in both the Wessel Islands group and the Cunningham Islands group in the Northern Territory of Australia.

External links
 Wessel Islands map

Islands of the Northern Territory